Ikeda City Satsukiyama Gymnasium is an arena in Ikeda, Osaka, Japan.

Facilities
Arena 1,680 m2（35×48m）
Swimming pools 25m x 7 courses
Training room

References

Basketball venues in Japan
Indoor arenas in Japan
Osaka Evessa
Sports venues in Osaka Prefecture
Ikeda, Osaka
Sports venues completed in 1996
1996 establishments in Japan